USM Alger is an Algerian sports club based in Algiers which is best known for its professional association football team. They played their first match in 1937, but only won their first trophy in 1963, to become the first Algerian champions after independent.

USM Alger are one of the most successful clubs in Algeria, having domestically won the Algerian Ligue Professionnelle 1 7 times, the Algerian Cup 8 times and the Algerian Super Cup 2 times. Internationally, USM Alger has won the UAFA Club Championship once, winning the last edition in 2013. The club also reached the final match of the 2015 CAF Champions League but he lost to TP Mazembe.

This list includes the major honours won by USM Alger and all-time statistics and records set by the club, its players and its coaches. The players section includes the club's top goalscorers and those who have made most appearances in first-team competitive matches. It also displays international achievements by players representing USM Alger, and the highest transfer fees paid and received by the club.

Honours 
As of the 2018–19 season, USM Alger have won a total of 17 titles (regional competitions not considered), of which 18 were achieved domestically and none were obtained in international competitions. The club's most recent honour is the 2018–19 Algerian Ligue Professionnelle 1.

Players

Appearances 
Most appearances: Mohamed Lamine Zemmamouche – 404 (2004–2009, 2011–present);
Most appearances in a season: Mohamed Hamdoud (2003–04) – 42;
Oldest league title winner: Abdelaziz Ben Tifour – 35 years, 11 months and 9 days (1962–63 Algerian Championnat National, 16 June 1963);
Youngest league title winner: Mohamed Madani – 18 years and 23 days (1962–63 Algerian Championnat National, 16 June 1963);
Most league appearances: Mohamed Lamine Zemmamouche – 298 (2004–2009, 2011–present);
Most Algerian Cup appearances: Mohamed Lamine Zemmamouche – 32 (2004–2009, 2011–present);
Most African Cup appearances: Mohamed Lamine Zemmamouche – 49 (2004–2009, 2011–present);
Most league appearances by a non-Algerian player: Carolus Andriamatsinoro – 97 (2012–2017);
Most consecutive appearances in international club competitions: 19 – Mohamed Lamine Zemmamouche;
Youngest debutant: 
Youngest starter in the league: Zineddine Mekkaoui – 18 years, 4 months and 22 days (against NA Hussein Dey, 2004–05 Algerian Championnat National, 2 June 2005);
Youngest league debutant: Hocine Metref – 17 years, 10 months and 1 day (against MO Constantine, 2001–02 Algerian Championnat National, 2 November 2001);
Youngest debutant in the African Cup / CAF Champions League: Michael Eneramo – 19 years, 3 months and 8 days (against Olympic Azzaweya, 2005 CAF Champions League First round, first leg, 6 March 2005);
Youngest captain in the African Cup / CAF Champions League: Billel Dziri – 25 years, 1 months and 16 days (against CD Travadores, 1997 CAF Champions League First round, first leg, 8 March 1997);
Youngest debutant in a CAF competition: Abdessamed Bounacer – 18 years, 3 months and 5 days (against Saint-Éloi Lupopo, 2022–23 CAF Confederation Cup Group stage, matchday 5, 19 March 2023);

Most appearances 
Competitive matches only, includes appearances as used substitute. Numbers in brackets indicate goals scored.

1 Includes the Super Cup, League Cup, Arab Champions League and UAFA Club Cup.
2 Includes the Cup Winners' Cup, CAF Cup, Confederation Cup and Champions League.

Goalscorers 

Most goals: 74 – Billel Dziri;
Most league goals: 51 – Billel Dziri;
Most seasons as league top scorer: 1 – Moncef Ouichaoui – (2002–03) & Oussama Darfalou – (2017–18);
Most goals in international club competitions: Billel Dziri – 16;
Most goals in international club competitions in a season: 10 – Mamadou Diallo (2004 CAF Champions League).
Youngest league scorer: Mehdi Benaldjia – 18 years, 6 months and 27 days (1–2 against NA Hussein Dey, 2009–10 Algerian Championnat National, 11 December 2009).
Youngest hat-trick scorer in the league: Michael Eneramo – 19 years, 6 months and 17 days (4–1 against OMR El Annasser, 2004–05 Algerian Championnat National, 13 June 2005).

Top goalscorers in all competitions 
Matches played (including as used substitute) appear in brackets.

1 Includes the Super Cup, League Cup, Arab Champions League and UAFA Club Cup.
2 Includes the Cup Winners' Cup, CAF Cup, Confederation Cup and Champions League.

Top goalscorers in international club competitions 
Matches played (including as substitute) appear in brackets.

National teams 

Most international caps while a USM Alger player: Mahieddine Meftah – 41 caps for Algeria;
First capped player: Abderrahmane Meziani for Algeria (2–1 against Bulgaria, 6 January 1963);
First player(s) capped for Algeria to play in the Olympic football tournament: Abderrahmane Derouaz (1980 Summer Olympics);
First player(s) to appear for Algeria at the FIFA World Cup: Zemmamouche (2014 FIFA World Cup);
First player(s) to appear for Algeria at the Africa Cup of Nations: Boubekeur Belbekri (1968 African Cup of Nations).
Youngest starter for Algeria: Abderrahmane Meziani – 20 years, 7 months and 24 days (2–1 against Bulgaria, friendly, 6 January 1963).

Honours 
Most titles: Mohamed Lamine Zemmamouche and Billel Dziri (9)
Most league titles: Mohamed Lamine Zemmamouche and Billel Dziri (4)
Most Algerian Cup titles: Dziri, Hamdoud, Ghoul, Djahnine, Meftah (5)
Most Super Cup titles: Zemmamouche, Chafaï, Khoualed, Meftah, Abdellaoui, Koudri, Meziane, Benmoussa and Andria (2)
Most titles in international club competitions:

Transfers

Management

Coaches 

Most seasons: 4 – Abdelaziz Ben Tifour (1962–1965, 1967–1968);
Most consecutive seasons: 3 – Abdelaziz Ben Tifour (1962–1965) and Djamel Keddou (1986–1989);
Most matches: 126 – Noureddine Saâdi;
Most matches in international club competitions: 12 – Miloud Hamdi;
Most titles in a season: 2 – Rolland Courbis (2012–13);
Most Ligue 1 titles: 2 – Mustapha Aksouh (1995–96, 2004–05);
Most consecutive Ligue 1 titles: None
Most Algerian Cup titles: 2 – Mustapha Aksouh (1998–99, 2003–04);
Most titles in international club competitions: None
Youngest coach: Abdelaziz Ben Tifour – 35 years, 2 months and 11 days (against RC Arbaâ, 1962–63 Algerian Championnat National, 7 October 1962);
Youngest coach to win an official competition: Abdelaziz Ben Tifour – 35 years, 10 months and 19 days (1962–63, 16 June 1963);
Youngest coach to win the Ligue 1: Abdelaziz Ben Tifour – 35 years, 10 months and 19 days (1962–63, 16 June 1963);
Youngest coach to win an international club competition: None

Presidents 

Longest-serving president: Saïd Allik –  years (since 1994 until August 6, 2010);
Most titles: Saïd Allik – 9:
Most Ligue 1 titles: Saïd Allik – 4:
Most Algerian Cup titles: Saïd Allik – 5:
Most Super Cup titles: Ali Haddad – 2:
Most titles in international club competitions: None:

Club

Matches 
Most official matches in a season: 48 (2012–13);
Best league start: 13 wins 1 draw (1962–63 Algerian Championnat National).

Firsts 
First match: USM Alger 2-2 JSO Hussein Dey (1937–38 Championnat F.S.G.T, 17 October 1937);.
First Ligue 1 match: RC Arbaâ 0–6 USM Alger (1962–63 Critérium d'Honneur, 7 October 1962);
First Algerian Cup match: USM Alger ?–? ? (1962-1963 Algerian Cup, 4 November 1962);
First Super Cup match: RS Kouba 3–1 USM Alger (1981 Algerian Super Cup, 20 August 1981);
First League Cup match: USM Alger 0–0 WA Boufarik (1995-1996 Algerian League Cup, 30 November 1995);
First match in international club competitions: CARA Brazzaville 1-0 USM Alger (1982 African Cup Winners' Cup First round, 4 April 1982);

Wins 
Biggest win: 13–0 (against SO Berrouaghia, 1962–63 Critérium d'Honneur, 23 December 1962);
Biggest Algerian Cup win: 7–0 (against US Remchi, 2003–04 Algerian Cup Round of 64, 5 February 2004);
Biggest Super Cup win: 2–0 (against ES Sétif, 2013 Algerian Super Cup, 11 January 2014);
Biggest Ligue 1 win: 11–0 (against ASM Oran, 1975–76 Algerian Championnat National matchday 12, 30 November 1975);
Biggest win in international club competitions: 8–1 (against ASFA Yennenga, 2004 CAF Champions League first round, 10 avril 2004);
Most wins in a season: 28 (2012–13);
Most consecutive league wins in a season: 11 in 18 matches (1962–63);
Fewest wins in the league in a season: 6 (1999–00 Algerian Championnat National);
Most consecutive away league wins in a season: 4 (1962–63 Algerian Championnat National);
Most international club competition wins in a season: 9 in 16 matches (2015 CAF Champions League);
Most consecutive international club competition wins in a season: 5 (2002 African Cup Winners' Cup);

Defeats 
Biggest defeat: 1–7 (against JS Kabylie, 1988–89 Championnat National matchday 29, 11 May 1989);
Biggest Algerian Cup defeat: 0–3 (against MC Alger, 2009–10 Algerian Cup Round of 16, 16 March 2010);
Biggest Super Cup defeat: 0–1 (against MC Alger, 2014 Super Cup, 9 August 2014);
Biggest Ligue 1 defeat: 1–7 (against JS Kabylie, 1988–89 Championnat National matchday 29, 11 May 1989);
Biggest defeat in international club competitions: 0–3 (against Primeiro de Agosto, 1998 Cup Winners' Cup Quarter-finals, 20 September 1998) and (against US Bitam, 2013 CAF Confederation Cup Second round, 4 May 2013);
Most defeats in the league in a season: 15 (1989–90 Algerian Championnat National);
Fewest defeats in the league in a season: 11 (1962–63 Algerian Championnat National);
Most consecutive home matches without defeats: 32 (from 18 April 2005 to 1 February 2007);
Most consecutive home matches without defeats in the league: 28 (from 18 April 2005 to 1 February 2007);
Most consecutive matches without defeats in the league: 25 (from 26 October 2013 to 13 September 2014).

Goals 
First goal in international club competitions: (against CARA Brazzaville, 1982 African Cup Winners' Cup First round, April 1982);
Most league goals scored in a season: 95 (in 24 matches, 1962–63 Algerian Championnat National);
Fewest league goals scored in a season: 15 (in 22 matches, 1999–00 Algerian Championnat National);
Most league goals conceded in a season: 44 (in 30 matches, 1964–65 Algerian Championnat National);
Fewest league goals conceded in a season: 11 (in 24 matches, 1962–63 Algerian Championnat National);
Most international club competition goals scored in a season: 21 (in 10 matches, 1997 CAF Champions League);
Most league minutes without conceding goals: 665 (2013–14 Algerian Ligue Professionnelle 1, from matchday 8 to matchday 15);
Most consecutive league matches scoring goals: 13 (3 April –8 December 2003);

Points 
Most points in a season:
Two points for a win: 35 (in 34 matches, 1987–88 Algerian Championnat National);
Three points for a win: 74 (in 30 matches, 1963–64 Algerian Championnat National);
Fewest points in a season:
Two points for a win: 23 (in 30 matches, 1989–90 Algerian Championnat National;
Three points for a win: 21 (in 22 matches, 1999–00 Algerian Championnat National);
Biggest distance in points to runners-up: 
Two-point-per-win system (before 1994–95): None;
Three-point-per-win system (as of 1994–95): 14 (2013–14 Algerian Ligue Professionnelle 1);

Stadiums 
Stade Omar Hammadi (1962–present):
First match: USM Alger 6–3 USM Blida (Critérium d'Honneur, 14 October 1962);
First goal: Krimo Rebih (against USM Blida, Critérium d'Honneur, 14 October 1962);
Highest attendance in an official match: 25,000 (against JS Kabylie, 2004–05 Algerian Championnat National, 10 February 2005).
Stade 5 Juillet 1962 (1972–present Derbies Only and international matches):
First match: USM Alger 0–2 Hamra Annaba (1971-72 Algerian Cup, 17 Juin 1972);
First goal: Ahmed Attoui  (against MC Alger, 1973 Algerian Cup Final, 19 Juin 1973);
Highest attendance in an official match: 90,000 (against MC Alger, 2004–05 Algerian Championnat National, 23 October 2004).

See also 
USM Alger in international club football

Notes

References 

USM Alger
Algerian football club records and statistics